Valaghuz (also Romanized as Valāghūz) is a village in Garmab Rural District, Chahardangeh District, Sari County, Mazandaran Province, Iran. At the 2006 census, its population was 160, in 38 families.

References 

Populated places in Sari County